Régnier or Regnier is a French given name, personal name and surname, and may refer to:

Surname
 Adolphe Regnier (1804-1884), French linguist
 Claude Ambroise Régnier (1746–1814), French lawyer and politician
 Émile Régnier (1894–1940), French World War I pilot
 Eva Regnier (born 1971), American decision scientist
 Henri de Régnier (1864–1936), French symbolist poet
 Marc Regnier (died circa 1960), American classical guitarist
 Mary Pius Regnier (1914–2005), American nun and former general superior of the Sisters of Providence of Saint Mary-of-the-Woods, Indiana
 Mathurin Régnier (1573–1613), French satirist
 Michel Régnier (1931–1999), "Greg", Belgian comics writer and artist
 Natacha Régnier (born 1974), Belgian actor
 Nicolas Régnier (1591–1667), Flemish painter and art collector
 Paule Régnier (1888–1950), French writer
 Victor Régnier (1889–1966), French World War I pilot

Personal name
 Regnier I, Count of Hainaut (850-915), son of Gislebert, Count of Darnau and Ermengarde of Lorraine
 Regnier II, Count of Hainault (born 890), son of Regnier I, Count of Hainaut and Hersent of France
 Regnier III, Count of Hainaut (circa 920-973), son of Regnier II, Count of Hainaut
 Regnier de Graaf (1641–1673), Dutch physician and anatomist

Other
 Régnier Motor Company, an aircraft engine manufacturer founded by Émile Régnier

See also
 Rainer (disambiguation)
 Reginar
 Reinier
 Reynier (disambiguation)